The 2019 ICC Women's T20 World Cup Qualifier was an international women's cricket tournament that was held in August and September 2019 in Scotland. It was the fourth edition of the Women's T20 World Cup Qualifier and was the qualification tournament for the 2020 ICC Women's T20 World Cup tournament. The top two teams from the qualifier tournament progressed to the 2020 ICC Women's T20 World Cup in Australia. In June 2019, Cricket Scotland confirmed the tournament dates, format and  venues. The full schedule was confirmed on 8 August 2019.

In July 2019, the International Cricket Council (ICC) suspended Zimbabwe Cricket, with the team barred from taking part in ICC events, which put their participation in the tournament in doubt. The following month, with Zimbabwe banned from taking part in international cricket tournaments, the ICC confirmed that Namibia would replace them in the tournament.

Bangladesh were the first team to qualify for the Women's T20 World Cup, after they beat Ireland by four wickets in their semi-final match. Thailand qualified for their first Women's T20 Would Cup in the other semi-final, defeating Papua New Guinea by eight wickets. The final was played at Forthill, and saw Bangladesh claim their second title, beating Thailand by 70 runs in the final.

Qualification
Eight teams took part in the qualifier for the 2020 ICC Women's T20 World Cup. The first teams to qualify were Bangladesh and Ireland, who finished bottom of the group at the 2018 ICC Women's World Twenty20 tournament. Twenty-six teams entered qualifying for the remaining five places, with Scotland gaining the hosting rights in March 2019. In Asia, Thailand defeated the United Arab Emirates on the final match day to finish with a perfect record to book their place into the qualifier.

In May 2019, qualification tournaments were held in Africa, East-Asia and Pacific and the Americas. Zimbabwe, Papua New Guinea, and the United States all won their respective groups to advance to the qualifier. The final qualifying tournament was in Europe, which saw the Netherlands become the final team to reach the qualifier, as they finished ahead of Scotland on net run rate. On 7 August 2019, Zimbabwe was removed from the competition and replaced by Namibia due to their suspension from the ICC.

Squads
On 21 August 2019, the ICC confirmed all the squads and match officials for the tournament. The ICC appointed an all-female umpire panel, the first time this had happened at an ICC event.

Warm-up matches
Before the tournament, the eight teams took part in four warm-up matches which took place on 29 August 2019. These matches did not have WT20I status, as teams were allowed to field all fourteen members of their squad.

Group stage
The first round of matches saw rain affect all four of the matches that were scheduled to be played, with the game between Bangladesh and Papua New Guinea abandoned and moved to the reserve day. The other match in Group A was reduced to seven overs per side, with Kathryn Bryce taking two wickets and scoring 29 not out, as she led Scotland to a 30-run victory over the United States at Forthill. In Group B, Thailand opened their campaign with a 30-run victory over the Netherlands at Lochlands. Natthakan Chantam top-scored with 44, with Thailand scoring 76 runs from their nine overs, with the Netherlands only making 46 runs in reply. The final match of the opening day saw Ireland recording a seven wicket victory over Namibia, after Namibia made 83/9 from their twenty overs, with Eimear Richardson taking two wickets for ten runs. Ireland chased down the target in 15 overs with Mary Waldron top scoring with 33.

The second day of matches saw the first shock of the tournament, with Papua New Guinea beating hosts Scotland by six wickets in Group A. Scotland's captain, Kathryn Bryce, admitted that her side was below par at the halfway point, and that the team gave away too many runs. In the other match in Group A, Bangladesh easily beat the United States, after the United States were bowled out for 46 runs, with Bangladesh winning by eight wickets. In Group B, Namibia started strongly against Thailand, with Sylvia Shihepo taking three wickets for eight runs, as Thailand were restricted to 99/6 in their 20 overs. However, Namibia were bowled out for 61 runs, with Chanida Sutthiruang taking three wickets for ten runs, with Thailand winning by 38 runs. In the day's final game, Ireland beat the Netherlands by 19 runs, despite a fightback from the Dutch side, after Ireland posted 120 runs in their innings. The wins for Thailand and Ireland guaranteed both sides a semi-final place. In the rescheduled match between Bangladesh and Papua New Guinea, Bangladesh won a close game by six runs, via the DLS method.

The final day of matches started in Group B with Thailand finishing top of the group with a two-run victory over Ireland. After Leah Paul took three wickets in the Thailand innings, Ireland made a poor start in their run chase. Ireland's captain, Laura Delany, said that they struggled with partnerships and was left with too much to get, as they lost four wickets in four overs, with Thailand winning the match. The other match in Group B saw the Netherlands record their first victory of the tournament, with a six wicket win. Iris Zwilling and Heather Siegers each took three wickets to restrict Namibia to 91 for 8 from their twenty overs. In response, Sterre Kalis top scored for the Netherlands, as they chased down the target with 17 balls to spare. In Group A, Bangladesh beat Scotland by 13 runs in a rain-affected match. Scotland suffered a collapse in their run chase, losing four quick wickets, including three run outs, to end their chances of progressing to the Women's T20 World Cup. Papua New Guinea beat the United States by 22 runs in another match impacted by the weather. Sibona Jimmy scored an unbeaten half-century and took three wickets, in a player of the match performance, to help Papua New Guinea secure their second win of the tournament. Therefore, Bangladesh and Papua New Guinea advanced to the semi-finals with wins in their final group matches.

Group A

Group B

Semi-finals
The semi-finals saw Bangladesh and Thailand win their respective matches, to see them both progress to the tournament's final and the 2020 ICC Women's T20 World Cup tournament in Australia. Ireland made 85 runs from their 20 overs, with Bangladesh chasing down their target to win by four wickets. Papua New Guinea only scored 67 runs in their 20 overs, with Thailand going on to win the fixture by eight wickets.

In the play-off semi-finals, both teams batting second recorded big wins against their opponents. The United States made 90 for 4, with Nadia Gruny scoring an unbeaten fifty. However, the Netherlands chased down their target to win by nine wickets. In the final match of the day, Namibia were bowled out for 67 runs inside 18 overs. With only 68 runs needed for victory, Scotland reached their target in 8.4 overs, winning the match by ten wickets.

Play-off matches
In the third-place playoff, Ireland had a convincing win against Papua New Guinea. Konio Oala was the only cricketer for Papua New Guinea to reach double figures, making 35 runs, as the team finished on 85/8 from their twenty overs. Ireland chased down the target inside twelve overs, to win by eight wickets. The playoff for seventh place saw the United States beat Namibia by six wickets, with the US team chasing down a target of 85 to win in the penultimate over of the match.

The last pair of matches in the tournament started with the fifth-place playoff between Scotland and the Netherlands. Sisters Kathryn and Sarah Bryce both made half centuries, with Scotland scoring 167/4 in their twenty overs. In reply, the Netherlands were bowled out for 97 runs, with Miranda Veringmeier top-scoring with 45, and Scotland winning by 70 runs. In the tournament's final, Bangladesh beat Thailand, also by the margin of 70 runs, with Sanjida Islam scoring 71 not out.

Final standings

 Qualified for the 2020 World Twenty20.

References

External links
 Series home at ESPN Cricinfo

International cricket competitions in 2019
Qualifier
2019 in women's cricket
2019 in Scottish cricket
International cricket competitions in Scotland
August 2019 sports events in the United Kingdom
September 2019 sports events in the United Kingdom
ICC Women's World Twenty20 Qualifier
ICC Women's World Twenty20 Qualifier